The Chamberlin is a retirement community in Hampton, Virginia, overlooking Hampton Roads at Old Point Comfort. It was formerly known as the Chamberlin Hotel, named for the famed restaurateur and original owner John Chamberlin. The nine-story building sits on historic Fort Monroe and overlooks Fort Wool. Listed on the National Register of Historic Places, it has been renovated from its former life as a hotel into a luxury retirement community for people aged 55 and up.

The second floor has retained the hotel atmosphere while the rest of the floors have been renovated and turned into one- and two-bedroom apartments. A few apartments are used as guest quarters for visiting relatives of residents.

The current building opened in 1928 as the Chamberlin-Vanderbilt Hotel, under the direction of Marcellus E. Wright Sr., with Warren and Wetmore consulting. It replaced an earlier Chamberlin Hotel, designed by Washington, D.C., architects John L. Smithmeyer and Paul J. Pelz and completed in 1896, which had in turn replaced the Hygeia. The current building originally had two large cupolas on its roof but these were removed during World War II because they were visible from out in the ocean beyond the Virginia Capes and it was feared that they could potentially aid a hostile German warship cruising offshore in targeting Fort Monroe.  They were never replaced after the war.

References

External links

Official website
History of the building and site
Reese, Fraklin W., "U.S. Hotel Chamberlin", Coast Artillery Journal, March-April 1942, Vol. 85, No. 2 

Beaux-Arts architecture in Virginia
Buildings and structures in Hampton, Virginia
Historic district contributing properties in Virginia
Hotel buildings completed in 1928
Hotel buildings on the National Register of Historic Places in Virginia
National Register of Historic Places in Hampton, Virginia
Residential buildings on the National Register of Historic Places in Virginia
Retirement communities
Tourist attractions in Hampton, Virginia
1928 establishments in Virginia